Vilaprisan (developmental code name BAY-1002670) is a synthetic and steroidal selective progesterone receptor modulator (SPRM) which is under development by Bayer HealthCare Pharmaceuticals for the treatment of endometriosis and uterine fibroids. It is a potent and highly selective partial agonist of the progesterone receptor (PR). As of 2017, the drug is in phase II clinical trials for the aforementioned indications.

See also
 List of investigational sex-hormonal agents § Progestogenics
 Lonaprisan
 Mifepristone
 Onapristone
 Ulipristal acetate

References

External links
 Vilaprisan - AdisInsight

Tertiary alcohols
Estranes
Enones
Organofluorides
Selective progesterone receptor modulators
Benzosulfones
Conjugated dienes